Luis Armando Montoya Navarro (born 8 December 2000) is a Mexican badminton player. He was part of the Mexican team that won the gold medal at the 2018 Central American and Caribbean Games in Barranquilla, Colombia.

Achievements

Pan Am Championships
Men's doubles

BWF International Challenge/Series (7 titles, 8 runners-up) 
Men's singles

Men's doubles

Mixed doubles

  BWF International Challenge tournament
  BWF International Series tournament
  BWF Future Series tournament

References

External links 
 

2000 births
Living people
Sportspeople from Guadalajara, Jalisco
Mexican male badminton players
Badminton players at the 2019 Pan American Games
Pan American Games competitors for Mexico
Central American and Caribbean Games gold medalists for Mexico
Competitors at the 2018 Central American and Caribbean Games
Central American and Caribbean Games medalists in badminton
21st-century Mexican people